Road South is a constituency of the Anguillan House of Assembly. The representative is Haydn Hughes of the Anguilla Progressive Movement.

Representatives

Election results

Elections in the 2020s

|- class="vcard" 
  | style="background-color:"|
  | class="org" style="width: 130px" | AUF
  | class="fn" | Curtis Richardson
  | style="text-align:right;" | 540
  | style="text-align:right;" | 42.6
  | style="text-align:right;" | -8.7
|-

Elections in the 2010s

Elections in the 2000s

Elections in the 1990s

Elections in the 1980s

External links
Constituency results on the government's website. 

Constituencies of the Anguillan House of Assembly